Ferozwala Tehsil , is an administrative subdivision (tehsil) of Sheikhupura District, Punjab, Pakistan. It is headquartered at the city of Ferozwala.

References

Tehsils of Sheikhupura District